Waikiwi is a suburb of Invercargill, Southland, New Zealand. Invercargill is the southernmost city of New Zealand.

Waikiwi lies on the northern edge of Invercargill. It is bounded on the west by the Ohai Industrial Line and on the south by the Waihopai River. There is farmland to the north and east, although the suburb is expanding to the north.

Prestonville, a commercial and industrial area, is located south-west of Waikiwi.

Thomsons Bush, a reserve, is located south-east of the settlement.

History

In 1984, there was a major flood in Grasmere and neighbouring suburbs. It caused extensive property damage, and some people lost their jobs or became homeless. Flood banks were installed to prevent further floods.

Demographics

Donovan Park had a population of 2,484 at the 2018 New Zealand census, an increase of 129 people (5.5%) since the 2013 census, and an increase of 426 people (20.7%) since the 2006 census. There were 987 households. There were 1,128 males and 1,356 females, giving a sex ratio of 0.83 males per female. The median age was 51.8 years (compared with 37.4 years nationally), with 375 people (15.1%) aged under 15 years, 330 (13.3%) aged 15 to 29, 906 (36.5%) aged 30 to 64, and 870 (35.0%) aged 65 or older.

Ethnicities were 90.6% European/Pākehā, 9.7% Māori, 2.3% Pacific peoples, 4.2% Asian, and 2.3% other ethnicities (totals add to more than 100% since people could identify with multiple ethnicities).

The proportion of people born overseas was 10.4%, compared with 27.1% nationally.

Although some people objected to giving their religion, 39.6% had no religion, 51.2% were Christian, 0.7% were Hindu, 0.7% were Muslim, 0.2% were Buddhist and 0.8% had other religions.

Of those at least 15 years old, 312 (14.8%) people had a bachelor or higher degree, and 621 (29.4%) people had no formal qualifications. The median income was $29,200, compared with $31,800 nationally. 360 people (17.1%) earned over $70,000 compared to 17.2% nationally. The employment status of those at least 15 was that 897 (42.5%) people were employed full-time, 270 (12.8%) were part-time, and 36 (1.7%) were unemployed.

Education
Southland Adventist Christian School is a state-integrated full primary school for years 1–8. It has a roll of  students. The school was established in Invercargill Central in 1955 and moved to Waikiwi in 1968. In 2021 it moved to its current site in Waikiwi.

Sacred Heart School is a Catholic state-integrated contributing primary school for years 1 to 6 with a roll of  students. The school opened in 1962.

Both these schools are coeducational. Roll are as of 

Waikiwi School was a state primary school established in 1872. It was merged to Grasmere School in January 2005.

References

Suburbs of Invercargill